Horace Trumbauer (December 28, 1868 – September 18, 1938) was a prominent American architect of the Gilded Age, known for designing residential manors for the wealthy. Later in his career he also designed hotels, office buildings, and much of the campus of Duke University.  Trumbauer's massive palaces flattered the egos of his "robber baron" clients, but were dismissed by his professional peers. His work made him a wealthy man, but his buildings rarely received positive critical recognition. Today, however, he is hailed as one of America's premier architects, with his buildings drawing critical acclaim even to this day.

Career
Trumbauer was born in Philadelphia, the son of Josiah Blyler Trumbauer, a salesman, and Mary Malvina (Fable) Trumbauer. He completed a 6-year apprenticeship with G. W. and W. D. Hewitt, and opened his own architectural office at age 21.  He did some work for developers Wendell and Smith, designing homes for middle-class planned communities, including the Overbrook Farms and Wayne Estate developments.

Trumbauer's first major commission was Grey Towers Castle (1893), designed for the sugar magnate William Welsh Harrison.  Its exterior was based on Alnwick Castle in Northumberland, England, although its interiors were French, ranging in style from Renaissance to Louis XV.

Harrison introduced him to the streetcar tycoon and real-estate developer Peter A. B. Widener, whose 110-room Georgian-revival palace, Lynnewood Hall (1897–1900), launched Trumbauer's successful career. For the Wideners, the Elkins's, and their circle he designed mansions in Philadelphia, New York, and Newport, RI. Through these connections, and others, he designed office buildings, hospitals, and institutional buildings. Known for his academic facility designs, some of his most notable works include commissions for the University of Pennsylvania, Harvard University, Duke University, and others. Harvard University's principal library, the Harry Elkins Widener Memorial Library, was built with a gift from Eleanor Elkins Widener as a memorial to her son, Harry, Class of 1907, an enthusiastic young bibliophile who died on RMS Titanic.

On April 25, 1903, Trumbauer married Sara Thomson Williams and became stepfather to her daughter, Agnes Helena Smith, from her previous marriage to iron dealer C. Comly Smith. Architectural Record published a survey of his work in 1904, less than a decade after his first major commission. 

In 1906, Trumbauer hired Julian Abele, the first African-American graduate of the University of Pennsylvania Architecture Department, promoting him to chief designer in 1909. Many of Trumbauer's later buildings are largely attributed to Abele. He contributed to the design of more than 400 buildings, including the Widener Memorial Library at Harvard University (1912–15), Philadelphia's Central Library (1917–27), and the Philadelphia Museum of Art (1914–28). He was also the primary designer of the west campus of Duke University (1924–54). With the exception of the chapel at Duke University (1934), Abele never claimed credit for any of the firm's buildings designed during Trumbauer's lifetime.

The commission for the Philadelphia Museum of Art (1916–28) was shared between Trumbauer's firm and Zantzinger, Borie and Medary. Trumbauer's architect Howell Lewis Shay is credited with the building's plan and massing, although the perspective drawings appear to be in Abele's hand. When it opened in 1928, the building was criticized as being vastly overscaled and nicknamed "the great Greek garage". But, perched on Fairmount Hill and terminating the axis of the Benjamin Franklin Parkway, it is now considered to be the most magnificently situated museum in the United States.

In 1923, Trumbauer was hired by the Reading Company to design the Jenkintown Train Station. A fine example of Queen Anne revival architecture, it still stands today as the Jenkintown-Wyncote station and was added to the National Register of Historic Places in 2014. His work was also part of the architecture event in the art competition at the 1928 Summer Olympics.

In 1933, Trumbauer was commissioned to build an ornate Ancien-Regime French style mansion for Herbert Nathan Straus, the youngest son of Macy's founder Isidor Straus. Built in limestone with intricate carvings on the façade, the Herbert N. Straus House is now the largest private residence in Manhattan. The mansion exemplifies the classic but opulent style requested of industry barons of that time.

Despite tremendous success and his apparent ability to impress wealthy clients, Trumbauer suffered from overwhelming shyness and a sense of inferiority about his lack of formal education. He had a number of commissions until the Great Depression, but began to drink heavily, and tragically died of cirrhosis of the liver in 1938. He is buried in West Laurel Hill Cemetery, Bala Cynwyd, Pennsylvania.

Selected buildings

Philadelphia and its suburbs

Residences

 Edward B. Seymour House (1891)
 John H. Watt house ("Tower House"), Wayne, Pennsylvania (1893). Part of Wendell & Smith's Wayne Estate development.
 Grey Towers Castle (William Welsh Harrison mansion), Glenside, PA (1893–94)
 Chelten House (George W. Elkins mansion), Elkins Park, PA (1896, rebuilt 1909)
 Lynnewood Hall (Peter A. B. Widener mansion), Elkins Park, PA (1897–1900)
 John C. Bell House, Rittenhouse Square (1906)
 Elstowe Manor (William L. Elkins mansion), Elkins Park, PA (1898)
 Edward C. Knight townhouse, 1629 Locust St., Philadelphia, PA (1902)
 Georgian Terrace (George F. Tyler mansion), Elkins Park, PA (1905) (now Stella Elkins Tyler School of Art, Temple University)
 Isle Field (mansion), Villanova, PA (1911) (now offices of Agnes Irwin School)
 Ardrossan, Radnor, PA (1913)
 Bloomfield, Villanova, PA
 Whitemarsh Hall (Edward T. Stotesbury mansion), Wyndmoor, PA (1916–21, demolished 1980)
 Ronaele Manor (Fitz Eugene Dixon mansion), Elkins Park, PA (1923–26, demolished 1974). Mrs. Dixon was Eleanor Widener; the mansion's name is hers spelled backward. LaSalle College Christian Brothers owned the mansion from 1950 to 1974, renaming it Anselm Hall.
 Woodcrest Mansion, 610 King of Prussia Rd. Radnor Township, PA (1901 - 1907)
 141 Pelham Rd., W. Mt. Airy, Philadelphia, PA (source: Germantown Historical Society)
 209 Pelham Rd., W. Mt. Airy, Philadelphia, PA (source: Germantown Historical Society)
 Katherine Craig Wright Muckl Mansion, 11 Coopertown Rd, Haverford, PA (1926)
 Woodburne Mansion (Edgar Thomson Scott Sr. mansion), Darby, PA (1906)

Commercial

 St. James Apartment House, 13th & Walnut Sts., Philadelphia, PA (1901)
 Land Title Building, 100 S. Broad St., Philadelphia, PA (1902)
 Ritz-Carlton Hotel, Philadelphia, SE corner Broad & Walnut Sts., Philadelphia, PA (1911, altered beyond recognition)
 Widener Building, South Penn Square, Philadelphia, PA (1914)
 Adelphia Hotel, 1229 Chestnut St., Philadelphia, PA (1914)
 Beneficial Savings Fund Society Building, SW corner 12th & Chestnut Sts., Philadelphia, PA (1916)
 Bankers' Trust Office Building, 12th & Chestnut Sts., Philadelphia, PA (1922)
 Public Ledger Building, 6th & Chestnut Sts., Philadelphia, PA (1923)
 Benjamin Franklin Hotel, 834 Chestnut St., Philadelphia, PA (1925)
 Chateau Crillon Apartment House, Locust St. & Rittenhouse Square West, Philadelphia, PA (1928)
 Jenkintown Train Station, Jenkintown, PA (1932)
 Racquet Club of Philadelphia, Philadelphia, PA (1906)
 Equitable Trust Building, 1405 Locust St., Philadelphia, PA (1925)
 North Broad Street Station, Philadelphia, PA (1929)
 Philadelphia Stock Exchange, 1409 1411 Walnut St. Philadelphia, PA (1913)

Cultural, medical and educational

 Music Pavilion at Willow Grove Park, Willow Grove, PA (1895, demolished)
 Bandshell in West Park, Allentown, PA (1908–1909)
 Union League of Philadelphia Annex, 15th & Sansom Sts., Philadelphia (1909)
 Elkins Memorial YMCA, Arch St., Philadelphia (1911)
 Philadelphia Racquet Club, 213–25 S. 16th St., Philadelphia (1912)
 Widener Memorial Training School for Crippled Children, 1450 W. Olney Ave., Philadelphia (1912–14)
 Philadelphia Museum of Art (with Zantzinger, Borie and Medary), Philadelphia (1916–28)
 Social Service Building, Philadelphia (1923–24)
 The Free Library of Philadelphia's Parkway Central Library, Logan Square, Philadelphia (1925–27)
Pedestal for the Statue of Edgar Fahs Smith, Philadelphia (1926)
 Irvine Auditorium, University of Pennsylvania, 34th & Spruce Sts., Philadelphia (1926–32)
 Keswick Theatre, Glenside, PA (1928)
 Hahnemann University Hospital South Tower, Philadelphia (1928)
 Jefferson Medical College, Main Building, Philadelphia (1929)
 Jefferson Medical College, Curtis Clinic, 1001–15 Walnut St., Philadelphia (1931)
 St. Paul's Episcopal Church, Old York and Ashbourne Rds., Elkins Park, PA (1897-1924)
 West Laurel Hill Cemetery, 227 Belmont Ave., Bala Cynwyd, PA

Buildings elsewhere
 
 St. John the Evangelist Episcopal Church, Somerville NJ (1895)
 The Elms (Edward Julius Berwind mansion), Newport, Rhode Island (1899–1901)
 St. Catherine Church, Spring Lake, New Jersey (1901)
 The John R. Drexel Mansion, 1 East 62nd Street, New York, NY (1903)
 Clarendon Court (Edward C. Knight mansion), Newport, Rhode Island (1904)
 Perry Belmont House, 1618 New Hampshire Ave NW, Washington DC (1906–1909)
 El Pomar Estate, Colorado Springs, Colorado (1909–1910)
 Consolidation Coal Company Office Building, Fairmont, West Virginia (1911) (now WesBanco Building)
 James B. Duke House (now Institute of Fine Arts, New York University), New York City (1909–1912)
 High Gate (James E. Watson mansion), Fairmont, West Virginia (1910–1913)
 Miramar (Eleanor Elkins Widener mansion), Newport, Rhode Island (1914)
 Daniel B. Zimmerman Mansion, Somerset Township, Somerset County, Pennsylvania (1915)
 Harry Elkins Widener Memorial Library, Harvard University, Cambridge, Massachusetts (1915)
 New York Evening Post Building, New York, New York (1926)
 Pere Marquette Hotel, 501 Main St. Peoria, Illinois (1926)
 Shadow Lawn (Hubert Templeton Parson mansion), West Long Branch, New Jersey (1927) (now Woodrow Wilson Hall, Monmouth University)
 Wildenstein Art Gallery, 19-21 East 64th Street, New York, New York (1932)
 Herbert N. Straus House, 9 East 71st Street, New York, New York (1932)
 Rose Terrace (Anna Dodge mansion), Grosse Pointe Farms, Michigan (1934, demolished 1976)
 Duke Chapel, Duke University, Durham, North Carolina (1934) (Julian Abele credited as the designer)
 El Mirasol, Palm Beach, Florida (1920)

Gallery

References

Bibliography
 Kathrens, Michael C. American Splendor: The Residential Architecture of Horace Trumbauer. New York: Acanthus Press, 2002.

External links

 Biography at Philadelphia Architects and Buildings
 Overview of an archival finding aid on Horace Trumbauer at the Winterthur Library.
 Residential Designs by Horace Trumbauer from Free Library of Philadelphia
 Commercial and Institutional Designs by the Horace Trumbauer Architectural Firm from Free Library of Philadelphia
 
 Biography at NYC-architecture.com
 The Horace Trumbauer Collection, including architectural drawings, blueprints and details of buildings and estates (some that were never built), are available for research use at the Historical Society of Pennsylvania.

1868 births
1938 deaths
Deaths from cirrhosis
Duke University people
American residential architects
Architects from Philadelphia
Burials at West Laurel Hill Cemetery
Defunct architecture firms based in Pennsylvania
Olympic competitors in art competitions
19th-century American architects
20th-century American architects